AR15 most commonly refers to AR-15 style rifle designs made by various manufacturers after the patent on the Colt AR-15.  It may also refer to:

Rifles 
 Colt AR-15, a semi-automatic rifle manufactured and trademarked by Colt's Manufacturing Company, based on the original ArmaLite AR-15 design
 ArmaLite AR-15, a selective fire rifle designed by ArmaLite and a predecessor to the United States M16 rifle
 CAR-15, a line of compact, short barrel, selective-fire carbines manufactured by Colt
 List of Colt AR-15 & M16 rifle variants, for Colt-made firearms based on the original ArmaLite AR-15 design

Other 
 Area 15 (Nevada National Security Site), the location of three underground nuclear detonations during the 1960s
 Arkansas Highway 15, the designation for two state highways in Arkansas
 Asiarunner, a locomotive in service with the Vietnam Railways (designated as AR15 VR)
 USS Deucalion (AR-15), a repair ship built for the United States Navy during World War II
 AR15.com, a firearm-enthusiast web forum